The Baloch are the majority ethnic inhabitants of the region of Balochistan in Iran. They speak the Rakhshani and Sarawani dialects of Balochi, an Iranian language. They mainly inhabit mountainous terrains, which have allowed them to maintain a distinct cultural identity and resist domination by neighbouring rulers. The Baloch are predominantly Muslim, with the vast majority belonging to the Hanafi school of Sunni Islam, but there is also tiny proportion of Shia in Balochistan. Approximately 20-25% of the Baloch population live in Iran. Estimates of the Iranian Baloch population range from 1.5-2 million to as many as 2 million. The majority of the Baloch population reside in Pakistan, and a significant number i.e. 600,000 reside in southern Afghanistan. They are also spread in other countries of the world, such as the Persian Gulf states and Europe. In Iran, the Baloch are divided into two groups: the Makrani and the Sarhadi. The cities such as Iranshahr, Chabahar, Nikshahr, Sarbaz, and Saravan are known as the Makran region, while Zahedan and Khash are known as the Sarhad region.

Balochistan of Iran has been regarded as the most underdeveloped, desolate, and poorest region of the country. The government of Iran has been trying to reverse this situation by implementing new plans such as the creation of the Chabahar Free Trade Zone.

See also
 Bhagnari

References

Ethnic groups in Iran
Baloch people
Sistan and Baluchestan Province